Ber Street is a historic street in Norwich City Centre between Queens Road and King Street. An ancient Roman Road, it was once one of the major routes into Norwich city centre, since the 12th century.

The street now exists as a fragmented row of historical buildings and post-war industrial buildings as a result of Second World War bomb damage and 1960s slum clearance.

History
Ber Street Gate was first mentioned in 1146 AD, and it was built on a corner of the city wall which runs southeast and southwest from the gate. The gate itself was demolished in 1808 but the street remained busy and densely populated. It was known locally as "Blood and Guts Street", due to its many slaughterhouses and butcher shops, and because cattle was driven down the road into the city.

Richmond Hill 
The area between Ber Street and King Street was densely populated from the 1840s onwards. It consisted of many yards and courts leading off Ber Street. Known locally as the Village on the Hill, three main roads, Mariners Lane, Horns Lane and Thorn Lane lead into the district. It became the settlement for a small Italian community, who later set up Vallori's Ice Cream. In 1960, the district was condemned as slums, and many residents were forced to leave due to compulsory purchase orders on the old terraces and lanes.  

The whole borough was demolished, which consisted of around 56 acres of existing streets, including 833 dwellings (612 considered unfit for human habitation), 42 shops, 4 offices, 22 public houses and 2 schools. Communities were moved to high rise buildings such as Normandy Tower, or new housing estates such as the Tuckswood Estate, that were being built around the city at the time. A new road, Rouen Road was developed in the area's place in 1962, which consists mainly of light industrial units and council flats. Ber Street had its whole eastern side demolished. Low rise council housing was built in 1967–8.

Present day 
The street currently houses some light industrial units, and one public house, The Berstrete Gates. A small cafe has recently opened, The Ber Street kitchen. Various schemes have been proposed to reinstate the eastern side of the street, and make it part of the city centre once again.

Notable remaining buildings
Remnants of its earlier character and buildings still survive with the following buildings being the last ones left:

8, former Kings Arms public house, carriage entry on right of building, closed 1968, now offices.

89 and 91, Commercial house, 1884. Now art galleries.
125, former famous Jolly Butchers public house. 18th century, landlady Black Anna was a jazz singer. Closed 1989.
137, former Horse and Dray public house. Closed 2012, now a Chinese restaurant.
156, 16th or 17th century timber-framed house.
Ber House, 158 and 158A, 18th century Georgian house.
Ber Cottage, 160. 17th century jettied house. 

St John de Sepulchre, redundant Medieval church.

References

Buildings and structures in Norwich
Norwich